Ace Attorney is a series of visual novel adventure video games developed by Capcom. With storytelling fashioned after legal dramas, the first entry in the series, Phoenix Wright: Ace Attorney, was released in 2001; since then, five further main series games, as well as various spin-offs, prequels and high-definition remasters for newer game consoles, have been released. Additionally, the series has seen adaptations in the form of a live-action film and an anime, and has been the base for manga series, drama CDs, musicals and stage plays.

The player takes the roles of various defense attorneys, including Phoenix Wright, his mentor Mia Fey, and his understudies Apollo Justice and Athena Cykes, who investigate cases and defend their clients in court; they find the truth by cross-examining witnesses and finding inconsistencies between the testimonies and the evidence they have collected. The cases all last a maximum of three days, with the judge determining the outcome based on evidence presented by the defense attorney and the prosecutor. While the original Japanese versions of the games are set in Japan, the series' localizations are set in the United States (primarily Los Angeles), though retaining Japanese cultural elements. In the spin-off series Ace Attorney Investigations, the player takes the role of prosecutor Miles Edgeworth and in the prequel series The Great Ace Attorney Chronicles, of Phoenix's ancestor Ryunosuke Naruhodo. 

The series was created by the writer and director Shu Takumi. He wanted the series to end after the third game, but it continued, with Takeshi Yamazaki taking over as writer and director starting with Ace Attorney Investigations: Miles Edgeworth (2009); Takumi has since returned to write and direct some spin-off titles. The series has been well received, with reviewers liking the characters and story, and the finding of contradictions; it has also performed well commercially, with Capcom regarding it as one of their strongest intellectual properties. The series has been credited with helping to popularize visual novels in the Western world. As of December 31, 2022, the game series has sold 9.8 million units worldwide.

Games

The Ace Attorney series launched in Japan with the Game Boy Advance game Phoenix Wright: Ace Attorney in 2001, and has been published in the West since the release of a Nintendo DS port in 2005. The series currently consists of six main series games and five spin-offs.

Main series
 Phoenix Wright: Ace Attorney is the first entry in the series. It was originally released for the Game Boy Advance in 2001 in Japan; it has also been released for the Nintendo DS in 2005, Microsoft Windows in 2008, and the Wii and iOS in 2009.
 Phoenix Wright: Ace Attorney – Justice for All was originally released for the Game Boy Advance in 2002 in Japan; it has also been released for the Nintendo DS in 2006, Microsoft Windows in 2008, the Wii in 2010, and iOS in 2012.
 Phoenix Wright: Ace Attorney – Trials and Tribulations was originally released for the Game Boy Advance in 2004 in Japan; it has also been released for Microsoft Windows in 2006, the Nintendo DS in 2007, and the Wii in 2010.
 Apollo Justice: Ace Attorney was released for the Nintendo DS in 2007 in Japan and in 2008 in the West, for iOS and Android in 2016, and for Nintendo 3DS in 2017.
 Phoenix Wright: Ace Attorney – Dual Destinies was originally released for the Nintendo 3DS in 2013 in Japan, North America and Europe; outside of Japan, it was given a digital-only release. It was also released for iOS in 2014, and Android in 2017. It is the only game in the entire series to be rated Mature 17+ by the ESRB and 16 for PEGI.
 Phoenix Wright: Ace Attorney – Spirit of Justice was released for the Nintendo 3DS in 2016 in Japan, North America and Europe. Like Dual Destinies, it was given a digital-only release outside Japan. It was released for iOS and Android in 2017.

Spin-offs

Ace Attorney Investigations series
 Ace Attorney Investigations: Miles Edgeworth is the first entry in the Investigations spin-off series. It was released for the Nintendo DS in 2009 in Japan and in 2010 in the West; it has also been released for Android and iOS in 2017.
 Ace Attorney Investigations 2 is the second entry in the Investigations series. It was released for the Nintendo DS in 2011 in Japan; it has also been released for Android and iOS in 2017. It has not been released in the West and, as of 2023, is the only game in the series that has not had an official English language translation.

The Great Ace Attorney series
 The Great Ace Attorney: Adventures is the first entry in The Great Ace Attorney series. It was released for the Nintendo 3DS in 2015 in Japan; it has also been released for Android and iOS in 2017 in Japan. 
 The Great Ace Attorney 2: Resolve is the second entry in The Great Ace Attorney series. It was released for the Nintendo 3DS in 2017 in Japan; it has also been released for Android and iOS in 2018 in Japan.

Professor Layton crossover
 Professor Layton vs. Phoenix Wright: Ace Attorney is a crossover between Ace Attorney and the Professor Layton series. It was released for the Nintendo 3DS in 2012 in Japan and in 2014 in the West.

Compilations
 The first three main series games have been collected and released as two separate compilations: 
 Phoenix Wright: Ace Attorney Trilogy HD was released for iOS and Android in 2012 in Japan and for iOS in 2013 in the West, Capcom removed the mobile-only version of the game from stores, and replaced it with the console version on iOS and Android as of June 9th, 2022.
 Phoenix Wright: Ace Attorney Trilogy was released for the Nintendo 3DS in 2014, and PlayStation 4, Xbox One, Nintendo Switch, Microsoft Windows in 2019 and the console port for The Trilogy was released in 2022 for iOS and Android. 
 Both of The Great Ace Attorney games have been collected as a compilation:
 The Great Ace Attorney Chronicles was released in July 2021 for Nintendo Switch, PlayStation 4, and Microsoft Windows. This was the first time both games were made officially available outside of Japan.

Common elements

Gameplay

The Ace Attorney games are visual novel adventure games in which the player controls defense attorneys and defends their clients in several different episodes. The gameplay is split into two types of sections: investigations and courtroom trials. During the investigations, the player searches the environments, gathering information and evidence, and talks to characters such as their client, witnesses, and the police. Once enough evidence has been collected, the game moves on to a courtroom trial section.

In the courtroom trials, the player aims to get their client declared "not guilty". To do so, they cross-examine witnesses, and aim to find lies and inconsistencies in the testimonies. They are able to go back and forth between the different statements in the testimony, and can press the witness for more details on a statement. When the player finds an inconsistency, they can present a piece of evidence that contradicts the statement. If the player is correct, the game presents a sequence that often starts with the protagonist shouting "Objection!" and pointing at the witness along with a shift in music before they begin to grill the witness with the inconsistency, which has become an iconic aspect of the series. The player is penalized if they present incorrect evidence: in the first game, a number of exclamation marks are shown, with one disappearing after each mistake the player makes; in later games, a health bar that represents the judge's patience is used instead; and in 3DS games, the character's lawyer badge is used. If all exclamation marks or lawyer badges are lost, or the health bar reaches zero, the player loses the game and their client is declared guilty.

Several Ace Attorney games introduce new gameplay mechanics to the series. Justice for All introduces "psyche-locks", which are shown over a witness when the player asks them about a topic they do not want to discuss; using a magatama, the player can start breaking the psyche-locks by showing the witness evidence or character profiles that proves they are hiding something. The number of psyche-locks depends on how deep the secret is; when all locks are broken, the topic becomes available, giving the player access to new information. Apollo Justice introduces the "perceive" system, where the player looks for motions or actions made by witnesses that show nervousness, similar to a tell in poker.

Dual Destinies introduces the "mood matrix", through which the player can gauge the emotions of a witness, such as tones of anger when mentioning certain topics; if the player notices a contradictory emotional response during testimony, they can point out the discrepancy and press the witness for more information. Dual Destinies also introduces "revisualization", where the player reviews vital facts and forms links between evidence to reach new conclusions. Spirit of Justice introduces "divination séances", in which the player is shown the memories of victims moments before their deaths, and must find contradictions in the victim's five senses to determine what has happened. Professor Layton vs. Phoenix Wright: Ace Attorney introduces simultaneous cross-examinations of multiple witnesses, with the player being able to see and hear reactions from the different witnesses to the testimony and using this to find contradictions. The Great Ace Attorney introduces "joint reasoning", where the player finds out the truth by pointing out when their investigative partner Herlock Sholmes takes his reasoning "further than the truth".

The Ace Attorney Investigations spin-off series splits the gameplay into investigation phases and rebuttal phases, the latter of which is similar to the courtroom trials of the main series. During the investigation phases, the player searches for evidence and talks to witnesses and suspects. Things the player character notices in the environment are saved as thoughts; the player can use the "logic" system to connect two such thoughts to gain access to new information. At some points, the player can create hologram reproductions of the crime scene, through which they can discover new information that would otherwise be hidden. Ace Attorney Investigations 2 introduces "logic chess", where the player interrogates witnesses in a timed sequence that is visualized as a game of chess, with the player aiming to destroy the other character's chess pieces. To do this, they need to build up their advantage in the discussion by alternating between speaking and listening, and then choose to go on the offensive.

Characters and setting

The protagonist of the first three games is the defense attorney Phoenix Wright (Ryūichi Naruhodō in the Japanese version), who is assisted by the spirit medium Maya Fey; in the third game, Phoenix's mentor Mia Fey is also a playable character. In the fourth game, the protagonist is the defense attorney Apollo Justice; in the fifth, Phoenix, Apollo and the new defense attorney Athena Cykes are all protagonists; and in the sixth, Phoenix and Apollo are the main protagonists, while Athena is playable in one case. The spin-off The Great Ace Attorney is set in England near the end of the 19th century, and follows Phoenix's ancestor Ryunosuke Naruhodo.

Phoenix's childhood friend Miles Edgeworth, who is the protagonist of the Ace Attorney Investigations games, is a recurring rival prosecutor character; in addition to him, each new game in the series introduces a new rival: Franziska von Karma is introduced in the second game, Godot in the third, Klavier Gavin in the fourth, Simon Blackquill in the fifth, Nahyuta Sahdmadhi in the sixth, Baron van Zieks in Adventures, and Kazuma Asogi in Resolve. Most of the prosecutor characters are portrayed as powerful and arrogant characters of high social status and who care about keeping perfect-win records in court, and even may favor convictions over finding the truth, although most have secret motivations and sympathetic backstories and typically help the protagonist at the game's climax. Similarly to real Japanese prosecutors, the prosecutors in the series often directly oversee investigations, issuing orders to the police. Japanese attitudes towards the police force are reflected in the series, with the police being represented by incompetent characters such as Dick Gumshoe, Maggey Byrde and Mike Meekins. In the world of Ace Attorney, trials only last three days, and usually end with a "guilty" verdict, with trials taken up by the protagonists of the games being rare exceptions. The outcomes of cases are decided by a judge, based on evidence provided by the defense attorney and the prosecutor.

Development

The series was created by Shu Takumi, who wrote and directed the first three games. The first game was conceived in 2000 when Takumi's boss at the time, Shinji Mikami, gave him six months to create any type of game he wanted to; Takumi had originally joined Capcom wanting to make mystery and adventure games, and felt that this was a big chance for him to make a mark as a creator. The game was designed to be simple, as Takumi wanted it to be easy enough for even his mother to play. It was originally going to be a detective game, with Phoenix being a private investigator, but at one point Takumi realized that finding and taking apart contradictions was not related to detective work, and felt that the main setting of the game should be courtrooms.

Takumi cited Japanese mystery author Edogawa Ranpo as an inspiration, particularly The Psychological Test, a short story which involves a crime that "unravels due to the criminal's contradictory testimony." It had a big impact on him, and was a major influence on the game. He was also inspired by stories from another Japanese author, Shinichi Hoshi, stating that he was pursuing his "element of surprise and unexpectedness."

Takumi felt that the best way to write a mystery with a good climax is to reveal various clues, and then pull them together into one conclusion, and not have multiple possible endings. He said that the biggest challenge with that was to make the gameplay and story work together; the goal was to make the player feel like they have driven the story forward themselves, with their own choices, even though the game is linear. He only spent little time on writing a backstory for Phoenix before writing the first game's story, and instead made up dialogue and developed Phoenix's personality as he went along. He came up with the partner character Maya because he thought it would be more fun for players to have another character with them, giving them advice, than investigating on their own.

After the first game's development was finished, Mikami told Takumi that they should make an Ace Attorney trilogy, with a grand finale in the third game's last case. Takumi had originally planned to let Edgeworth be the prosecutor in all episodes in the second game, but during the production the development team learned that the character had become popular. This led to Takumi feeling that he had to use the character more carefully and sparingly; he created the new prosecutor character Franziska von Karma, to save Edgeworth for the game's last case, and avoid a situation where he—a supposed prodigy—loses every case. As Takumi wanted the three first Ace Attorney games to be parts of a larger work, he avoided making a lot of changes between games: art from the first game for main characters such as Phoenix, Maya and Edgeworth was reused, to avoid having the previous games look outdated in comparison to newer games in the series; and no new gameplay mechanics were added for Trials and Tribulations, as Takumi was happy with the gameplay after having added the psyche-lock mechanic for Justice for All.

For the fourth game, Takumi wrote the scenario and took on a supervisory role. He had wanted the series to end with the third game, as he felt Phoenix had been fully explored and that his story had been told; he said that it is important to know when to end a story, that he did not want the series to become a shadow of its former self, and that he did not see any reason to continue it. Despite this, the spin-off series Ace Attorney Investigations was created, being directed by Takeshi Yamazaki and produced by Motohide Eshiro; Takumi returned to the series to write the crossover Professor Layton vs. Phoenix Wright: Ace Attorney. He also directed and wrote The Great Ace Attorney, which was described as being the first entry in a new Ace Attorney series. He said that he has mixed feelings about the series being developed by other Capcom staff, comparing it to a parent sending their child to their first day in school. Yamazaki and Eshiro went on to direct and produce the main series entries Dual Destinies and Spirit of Justice. Due to exhaustion after working on Dual Destinies, Yamazaki split direction responsibilities with Takuro Fuse for Spirit of Justice, with Yamazaki working on the scenario, and Fuse on the art and gameplay. In 2020, Yamazaki left Capcom.

Localization
The localization of the first game was outsourced to Bowne Global, and was handled by the writer Alexander O. Smith and the editor Steve Anderson. While the Japanese version takes place in Japan, the localized version is set in the United States: because one of the episodes involves time zones, they had to specify where the game takes place, and chose the United States without thinking a lot about it. The Japanese justice system of the original still remained intact in the localization, as changing it would have altered the entire game structure.

The change in the series' setting became an issue in later games, where the Japanese setting was more obvious. Starting with the second game, the series localization direction has been handled by Janet Hsu; One of the first decisions she had to make was how to localize Maya's hometown and the mysticism of the Fey clan. She came up with the idea that the localized versions of the Ace Attorney games take place in Los Angeles in an alternative universe where anti-Japanese laws like the California Alien Land Law of 1913 were not passed, anti-Japanese sentiments were not powerful, and where Japanese culture flourished. This dictated what should be localized and what should be kept Japanese; things relating to the Fey clan and the Kurain channeling technique were kept Japanese, as that was Maya's heritage, while Japanese foods that were not widely known in the West were changed, such as changing Maya's favorite food from ramen to burgers. That particular change was mocked by players as the dish later became more well known in the West, and was lampshaded in the English release of Spirit of Justice, where Maya is described as liking both ramen and burgers.

Character names were also localized to use double meanings similarly to the Japanese names; the name puns were based on the characters' personalities or backgrounds, or were visual gags. Several English names were based on their Japanese counterparts, but for some characters the names had to be altered heavily compared to the Japanese versions. Smith and Anderson had a lot of freedom when localizing the names of minor characters in the first game, but discussed the names of the main cast with Capcom. Phoenix's English surname, "Wright", was chosen as his Japanese name, "Naruhodō"—meaning "I see" or "I understand"—was frequently used as a joke in the script.

Dual Destinies was given a digital-only release in the West as to release the English version as close to the Japanese release date as possible while maintaining a tight development schedule. Its follow-up, Spirit of Justice, was released in the same manner. Although Ace Attorney Investigations 2 has not been officially localized, an English fan translation has been made. Both The Great Ace Attorney games were released in the West with English localization in July 2021 as part of The Great Ace Attorney Chronicles, making Ace Attorney Investigations 2 the only game in the series to remain a Japan-only release.

Reception

The Ace Attorney series has been well received by critics, and has performed well commercially: in December 2009, it was Capcom's 9th-best-selling series of all time, and in October 2010, they called it one of their "strongest intellectual properties", with more than 3.9 million units sold worldwide. By December 2013, the series had sold over 5 million units. In the United States, the first game became surprisingly successful, forcing Capcom to prepare at least three additional runs to meet the demand. By June 2018, the series had sold over 6.7 million units. As of September 30, 2021, the series has sold 8.6million units worldwide.

Geoff Thew at Hardcore Gamer said that the "craziness" of the game world makes the cases entertaining, but also that it "resonates on a deeper level" due to its connection to the real Japanese legal system, making the setting still feel relevant in 2014. Bob Mackey at USgamer said that the Ace Attorney games were among the best written games of all time, and that the series' strength is how each game builds up to a "stunning and satisfying finale". Thomas Whitehead at Nintendo Life also liked the writing, praising its balance between "light-hearted nonsense" and darker, more serious scenarios. Several reviewers have appreciated the series' characters; Thew said that Phoenix and Maya's banter is among the best in video games, and that Edgeworth's character arc is one of the most compelling parts of the stories.

Reviewers have liked finding contradictions; a common complaint, however, is the games' linearity, as well as how the player sometimes has to resort to a trial-and-error method due to the games only accepting specific pieces of evidence, and how testimony statements sometimes need to be pressed in a specific order. Some reviewers have criticized the lack of changes to the gameplay and presentation throughout the series, while some have said that fans of the series would not have a problem with this.

Several reviewers have praised the series' music. They said that the greatest aspect of the series is its audio design, with the first three games using the Game Boy Advance sound chip better than any other game for that platform; he called the music phenomenal, with the exception of that in Justice for All, but said the sound effects are what "steals the show". Mackey commented that the games' small amounts of animations for each character are used well for their characterization.

Related media and other appearances

The Takarazuka Revue, an all-female theater troupe, has adapted the series into stage musicals: 2009's Ace Attorney: Truth Resurrected, which is based on the last episode of the first game; 2010's Ace Attorney 2: Truth Resurrected Again, whose first act is an original story, and whose second is based on the final episode of the second game; and 2013's Ace Attorney 3: Prosecutor Miles Edgeworth, which is set before the events of Truth Resurrected Again. A stage play based on the series, titled Gyakuten no Spotlight, ran in 2013, and was written by Eisaku Saito. A 2012 live-action film adaptation of the first game, titled Ace Attorney, was produced at the film studio Toei and directed by Takashi Miike. A 2016 TV anime adaptation of the series, Ace Attorney, was produced at A-1 Pictures and directed by Ayumu Watanabe.

Kodansha has published several manga based on the series: a short story anthology was published in Bessatsu Young Magazine in 2006; Phoenix Wright: Ace Attorney and Ace Attorney Investigations: Miles Edgeworth were serialized in Weekly Young Magazine in 2007 and 2009, respectively; and another manga, which is based on the anime, was published in V Jump in 2016. A novel based on the series, Gyakuten Saiban: Turnabout Idol, was released in June 2016. Ace Attorney drama CDs, soundtrack albums, and figurines have also been released.

Ace Attorney characters have made crossover appearances in other video games. Some Ace Attorney characters appear in SNK vs. Capcom: Card Fighters DS. Phoenix and Edgeworth make a cameo appearance in She-Hulk's ending in the fighting game Marvel vs. Capcom 3: Fate of Two Worlds; in the game's update, Ultimate Marvel vs. Capcom 3, Phoenix appears as a playable character. Phoenix and Maya are playable characters in Project X Zone 2, while Edgeworth makes a non-player appearance. Phoenix, Maya, Edgeworth and Franziska were all playable in the mobile game Monster Hunter Explore in 2017, as part of one of its temporary crossover events, and a Phoenix transformation is available for a companion character in Monster Hunter XX. Music from the Ace Attorney series is featured in Taiko Drum Master: Doko Don! Mystery Adventure, with Phoenix making an appearance in the game's story. In April 2021, Ace Attorney was introduced to Teppen alongside the Dead Rising franchise with the "Ace vs. The People" expansion.

Legacy

In 2015, GamesRadar+ named Phoenix Wright: Ace Attorney as the 55th-best video game of all time. In 2016, Famitsu readers voted Gyakuten Saiban as the second-most memorable Game Boy Advance title (behind only Pokémon Ruby and Sapphire) and Gyakuten Saiban 123 as the tenth-best Nintendo 3DS game. In 2017, Famitsu readers voted Gyakuten Saiban the third-best adventure game of all time, behind only Steins;Gate and 428: Shibuya Scramble.

The Ace Attorney series has been credited with helping to popularise visual novels in the Western world. Vice magazine credits the Ace Attorney series with popularising the visual novel mystery format, and notes that its success anticipated the resurgence of point-and-click adventure games as well as the international success of Japanese visual novels. According to Danganronpa director Kazutaka Kodaka, Ace Attorneys success in North America was due to how it distinguished itself from most visual novels with its gameplay mechanics, which Danganronpa later built upon and helped it also find success in North America.

The Ace Attorney series has also inspired many video games. The 2008 Capcom title Harvey Birdman: Attorney at Law, based on the animated series, shares many elements with the Ace Attorney series.  The 2013 title Socrates Jones: Pro Philosopher keeps the Ace Attorney format but swaps law for philosophical argument, and the 2015 adventure game Aviary Attorney features similar gameplay but with an all-bird cast of characters. The 2016 video game Detective Pikachu, which received a 2019 film adaptation, has also drawn comparisons to the Ace Attorney series.

Ace Attorney is referenced in several anime shows. In a murder mystery arc of the 2006 anime series Haruhi Suzumiya, the show's titular character mimics Phoenix Wright during an episode. The 2014 anime series No Game No Life also pays homage to the game during an episode.

In early 2021, a user on Reddit used artificial intelligence to create a bot that took selected Reddit forum arguments into short movies fashioned after Ace Attorney courtroom battles between the games' various characters.

Later that year, the San Francisco Chronicle took note of its queer inspiration and influence: the first game inspired a great deal of fanwork featuring same-sex pairings and developers in turn took inspiration from boys' love in writing the sequels' characters.

Notes

References

External links

 
Capcom franchises
Kodansha manga
Shueisha manga
Video game franchises
Video game franchises introduced in 2001
Video games set in Los Angeles
Video games set in Japan
Visual novels
Video games adapted into films
Video games adapted into television shows